Philosophical Perspectives is an annual peer-reviewed academic journal of philosophy. Each annual volume is dedicated to a specific theme addressing philosophical problems. The founding editor-in-chief was James E. Tomberlin, who edited the series from 1987 to 2002. Philosophical Perspectives became a supplement to Noûs in 1996 and is currently published by Wiley-Blackwell.

See also 
 List of philosophy journals

External links 
 

Philosophy journals
Wiley-Blackwell academic journals
English-language journals
Publications established in 1987
Annual journals
Contemporary philosophical literature